Devinder Kumar Jain (born 25 January 1948; mostly known as D. K. Jain) is an Indian retired Judge. He is former Judge of Supreme Court of India. He is also former and 26th Chief Justice of Punjab and Haryana High Court and a Judge of Delhi High Court.

Early life and career 
Jain was born on 25 January 1948. After completing B.Sc. and LL.B., he enrolled as an Advocate at Delhi on 9 August 1974. He was appointed the Additional Judge of the Delhi High Court on 19 March 1991 and became a permanent Judge from 23 January 1992. He was promoted as Chief Justice of Punjab and Haryana High Court on 11 March 2005. He was elevated as a Judge of the Supreme Court of India on 10 April 2006. He retired as the Supreme Court judge on 24 January 2013 and during the tenure he delivered 135 judgments. He was appointed the first court-appointed ombudsman for the Board of Cricket Control in India on 29 February 2019.

References 

Indian judges
1948 births
Living people
Justices of the Supreme Court of India
Chief Justices of the Punjab and Haryana High Court
People from Delhi
Judges of the Delhi High Court
21st-century Jains